Reynosa is a border city in the northern part of the state of Tamaulipas, in Mexico. It is also the municipal seat of Reynosa Municipality.

The city is located on the southern bank of the Rio Grande in the international Reynosa–McAllen metropolitan area, directly across the Mexico–United States border from Hidalgo, Texas.

As of 2013, the city of Reynosa has a population of 672,183.   If the floating population is included in the census count, the population can reach up to approximately 1,000,000.

History
On the 6th of July, 1686  Agustín Echeverz y Zuvízar, governor of the Nuevo Reino de León, camped in, what is now Reynosa, during an exploratory expedition. 

In December, 1748 leaves from Querétaro the expedition led by José de Escandón y Helguera, planning to establish 14 villages; the caravan consisted of 1500 colonists and 755 soldiers.

On the 14th of March, 1749 was founded (in its original location) the Villa de Nuestra Señora de Guadalupe de Reynosa, by the captain Carlos Cantú on behalf of Escandón, being as well in political and military command. The were 279 pioneer residents in charge of Friar Agustín Fragoso.

The city was named Reynosa in resemblance of the homonymous city Reinosa, birthplace of the viceroy Juan Francisco de Güemes y Horcasitas.

In August, 1750 it was the first flood documented in the village.

InApril, 1757 Reynosa had it first political conflict, when Escandón dismissed Carlos Cantú as the mayor of the village, replacing him by Pedro de Estrada, second mayor of Reynosa.

On the 9th of July, 1757 arrives to the village the captain José Tineda y Cuervo and the engineer Agustín López, both viceroyalty inspectors, to do a population census; showing that Reynosa had 280 inhabitants.

As a resoult of the census, they obtained authorization from the King of Spain to move the village to a placed named Santa María de las Lajas; which was not done because Escandón didn't consider the river a risk anymore.

In September, 1800 a flood of immense proportions occurred. The village was about to disappear; the villagers used canoes and rafts to arrive to the hills of El Morrillo. In 1802 the village moved to its actual location andthe new census showed1631 inhabitants by 1802.

In 1810 the building of the old church Nuestra Señora de Guadalupe began, by the parish priest Don José Cárdenas; it was finished in 1815 by Don Lorenzo Treviño.

In 1846 Reynosa was invaded by the american army during the Mexican-American war.

On the 10th of May,1910 the General Lucio Blanco with the constitutional army took Reynosa during the Mexican revolution.

On the 24th of November, 1926, Reynosa became a city.

Current

Reynosa extends across 3,156.34 sq kilometers (1218.66 sq. miles), representing 3.7 per cent of the Tamaulipas territory. Today it is the location of several satellite U.S. companies doing business to take advantage of low labor rates and industry incentives.

On 18 September 2012, an explosion at the nearby Pemex gas plant killed 30 and injured 46 people. Pemex Director Juan Jose Suarez said that there was "no evidence that it was a deliberate incident, or some kind of attack".

In 2017, it was described as a major hotspot in the Mexican Drug War, as a result of the internecine wars between the Gulf and Los Zetas drugs cartels.

Geography

Reynosa is the largest and most populous city in the state of Tamaulipas, followed by Matamoros, Nuevo Laredo, Ciudad Victoria, Tampico, and Río Bravo. In addition, the international Reynosa–McAllen Metropolitan Area counts with a population of 1,500,000 inhabitants, making it the third largest metropolitan area in the Mexico–U.S. border after San Diego–Tijuana and El Paso–Juárez. Reynosa is the 30th largest city in Mexico and anchors the largest metropolitan area in Tamaulipas.

In 2011, Reynosa was the fastest growing city in the state of Tamaulipas, and was among the top five fastest growing cities in Mexico.

Climate
Reynosa has a semi-arid climate (Köppen climate classification BSh) with short, mild winters and hot summers.

Notable people
Abraham Ancer – Professional golfer
Xavier Baez – Footballer
Jorge Cantú – Major League Baseball player
Christian Chávez – Singer and actor
Laura Flores – Actress, hostess and singer
Jaime Garcia – Major League Baseball player
Néstor Garza – Former WBA World Super Bantamweight Champion
José María Cantú Garza – Geneticist
Vidal Medina – Playwright and theatre director
Maki Esther Ortiz – Senator
Los Relámpagos del Norte – Musical duo
Komander – Wrestler
Beto Quintanilla – Artist
Sergio Peña Solís – Mexican drug lord (Los Zetas Cartel)

Transportation
Reynosa is served by the General Lucio Blanco International Airport, which has flights to multiple important Mexican cities on six airlines, some serving it with aircraft such as Boeing 737 and Airbus A320.

In addition, the McAllen Miller International Airport in McAllen, Texas, is also relatively close and is served by airlines like Allegiant Air, American and United.

References

Further reading

External links

Link to tables of population data from Census of 2005 INEGI: Instituto Nacional de Estadística, Geografía e Informática
Tamaulipas Enciclopedia de los Municipios de México
 Gobierno de Reynosa

 
Populated places in Tamaulipas
Mexico–United States border crossings
Lower Rio Grande Valley
Populated places established in 1749
1740s establishments in Mexico
1749 establishments in North America
Tamaulipas populated places on the Rio Grande